Donald Stringer may refer to:

 Donald Stringer (canoeist) (1933–1978), Canadian Olympic canoer
 Donald Stringer (fencer) (born 1928), British Olympic fencer